Fix is a surname. Notable people with the surname include:

Bernd Fix (born 1962), German computer security expert
George Fix (1939–2002), American mathematician
Helen Fix (born 1922), American politician
Josh Fix, South African musician
Lauren Fix, American automotive expert
Limor Fix,  Israeli electronic design automation engineer and executive
Oliver Fix (born 1973), German slalom canoeist
Paul Fix (1901–1983), American film and television character actor
Théodore Fix (1800–1846), French economist